Chinguetti is a department of the Adrar Region in Mauritania. The capital lies at Chinguetti, an ex-Middle Ages center for trade which is considered to be a ghost town. The other village in this mostly desert-area department is Ain Savra.

References

Departments of Mauritania
Adrar Region